Yengema Airport  is a regional airport located in Yengema, Kono District, Sierra Leone. It is the only airport that serves  Kono District. It is one of the busiest airports in the country, due to the present of large diamond mining companies in Kono District.

Yengema Airport serves  smaller plane, private jet, and helicopters that travel within Sierra Leone.

External links
Airport List

Airports in Sierra Leone